Karl Clark may refer to:
 Karl Clark (police officer)
 Karl Clark (chemist)